The wildlife of Tunisia is composed of its flora and fauna. It has 84 species of mammals and 375 species of birds. Tunisia is well documented for its addax and Dama Gazelle population.

Fauna
The fauna of Tunisia includes the following:

Spiders:
 Zodarion pusio

Insects:
 Agabus africanus
 Agabus ramblae
 Ameles assoi
 Ameles dumonti
 Bothriomyrmex breviceps
 Bothriomyrmex cuculus
 Bothriomyrmex decapitans
 Bothriomyrmex emarginatus
 Bothriomyrmex pubens
 Bothriomyrmex regicidus
 Cataglyphis fortis
 Cataglyphis hannae
 Moitrelia boeticella

Mammals

Birds

Notes

References

Biota of Tunisia
Tunisia